Black Canyon Diversion Dam is a dam in Gem County, Idaho.

The concrete dam was originally completed in 1924, then re-constructed between 1951 and 1955, by the United States Bureau of Reclamation. It impounds the Payette River for the diversion of water into the Black Canyon and North Side Main irrigation canals, and the generation of about 2 megawatts of hydroelectric power, part of the Bureau's larger Boise Project. The dam is owned and operated by the Bureau.

Recreation includes boating and fishing. The installation of a third hydropower generating unit has been funded by Bonneville Power Administration for completion in 2013.

References

Buildings and structures in Gem County, Idaho
Dams in Idaho
Reservoirs in Idaho
United States Bureau of Reclamation dams
Dams completed in 1924
Energy infrastructure completed in 1955
Hydroelectric power plants in Idaho
Lakes of Gem County, Idaho
Boise Project
1924 establishments in Idaho